Sunday Best Recordings is a British music label, founded by DJ Rob da Bank and Sarah Bolshi in 2000. The label has always been renowned for its expansive roster and an unswerving dedication to the leftfield.

History

Rob da Bank originally ran Sunday Best as a leftfield London club night from 1995, hosting DJs such as Fatboy Slim, Basement Jaxx and Andrew Weatherall. Celebrating an ‘anything goes’ music policy, the club night formed an essential blueprint for the Sunday Best label. Rob went on to co-create Bestival and Camp Bestival and presently broadcasts as a radio DJ on Gilles Peterson’s Worldwide FM after departing from BBC Radio One.

Sarah Bolshi cut her teeth working in A&R at Big Life Records, mentored by Jazz Summers, working on acts like The Orb and De Le Soul before establishing her first breakbeat label Bolshi Records in 1996.  She is in the process of re-releasing the Bolshi catalogue digitally via the Sunday Best umbrella.

Sarah and Rob joined forces in 2000 building a roster over the last 20 years which has included releases by film director David Lynch, Kitty Daisy and Lewis, dan le sac Vs Scroobius Pip, Valerie June and more recently L.A. Salami, O’Flynn and JW Francis to name but a few.

The team also co-founded Sunday Best Music Publishing working alongside Domino Publishing (sister company to Domino Records) signing much of the recording roster. In 2014, they also established an electronic imprint - Silver Bear Recordings - now label managed by London duo Wayward, who released their debut album through the label in March 2021. Silver Bear recordings have introduced emerging talents such as Kilig and Louf into the electronic world, and were also responsible for one of 2019’s biggest dance LPs: O’flynn’s ‘Aletheia’.

Artists
Artists released via the label include:

 Bastila
 Beardyman
 Boomclick
 The Cure
 Christopher D Ashley
 The Cuban Brothers
 dan le sac vs Scroobius Pip
 Rhoda Dakar
 David Lynch
 Dub Pistols
 Ebony Bones
 Mary Epworth
 The Ghost
 Grand National
 Alice Jemima
 JW Francis
 Kitty, Daisy & Lewis
 Klangkuenstler
 L.A. Salami
 Laucan
 Lemonade
 Lucky Elephant
 Max Sedgley
 Misty's Big Adventure
 New Order
 Norman Jay MBE
 Number
 O'Flynn
 Plastic Mermaids
 Plastic Operator
 Ben Ottewell
 Solar Bears
 Sound of Rum
 This Is the Kit
 Skinny Lister
 Valerie June
 Wayward
 Xylaroo

It also includes and Rob da Bank's own production outfit, Lazyboy.

See also

 List of record labels

References

External links
 Official website
 Beats Bar - interview with Rob da Bank about Sunday Best

Year of establishment missing
BBC Radio 1
Record labels based in London